Mesolia Uniformella is a moth in the family Crambidae. It was described by Anthonie Johannes Theodorus Janse in 1922. It is found in Botswana, Namibia, South Africa and Zimbabwe.

References

Ancylolomiini
Moths described in 1922